Strength & Honour by Canadian studio Magitech is a Microsoft Windows PC game of global domination that combines turn-based empire building and epic real-time tactics. Nations can belong to civilizations ranging from the Romans and Carthaginians in the west, to the West Indians and Chinese in the east.

The setting is around 200 BC. You choose your ruler and kingdom. You hand pick the members of your cabinet, governors of your cities, and the marshals and generals of your armies. Each Character in the game has a number of attributes which dictates their personality. Among these attributes include honor, ambition, loyalty, political ability, leadership ability, fighting ability, naval ability, and popularity. Each of these attributes may help you decide which character is the most appropriate to be appointed to your cabinate position.

A few traits will not change in an individual, Honor and ambition are examples of traits that do not change. A person with high honor will have a much slower rate of change in loyalty if they become unhappy. If you have a loyal character with very low honor and very high ambition, watch out because this person is very unstable and may turn disloyal at any time. Most characters in Strength and Honor do not like working for people with low popularity and may rebel against you if they find themselves being a subordinate to one of low popularity. Characters with high political ability make your best governors and ministers. The higher political ability will allow them to successfully run administrative type positions.

Because you are dependent on a large economy, characters with high political skills and popularity is a way to increase the populous and recruitment of personnel into your armies and cities. Besides the promoting of personnel you also have direct control through taxes for each city under your control as well as a national tax for your kingdom. Be cautious of over taxing your populous, it may result in decreasing your populous as people leave your cities. Libraries provide influence over a city's philosophy. Military philosophy will produce better generals, but a mercantilism or agrarianism type of philosophy may boost a cities economy.

The game had some difficulties finding a publisher in the US and UK, despite this setback the developer "Magitech" had decided to self-publish their game directly from their website in 2005. However the game was successfully published in Australia, Russia, Poland, Italy, China and Spain in 2004.

The game lacks a multiplayer server and is restricted to LAN and TC/PIP networking game play. Multiplayer also lacking a world mode (campaign multiplayer mode) and is limited to just battle mode.

References

External links
Strength & Honour official site

2004 video games
Windows games
Windows-only games
Real-time tactics video games
Turn-based strategy video games
4X video games
Video games developed in Canada